Gastromyzon embalohensis is a species of ray-finned fish in the genus Gastromyzon.

Footnotes 
 

Gastromyzon
Freshwater fish of Indonesia
Fish described in 1998